Multiplier may refer to:

Mathematics 
 Multiplier (coefficient), the number of multiples being computed in multiplication, also known as a coefficient in algebra
 Lagrange multiplier, a scalar variable used in mathematics to solve an optimisation problem for a given constraint
 Multiplier (Fourier analysis), an operator that multiplies the Fourier coefficients of a function by a specified function (known as the symbol)
 Multiplier of orbit, a formula for computing a value of a variable based on its own previous value or values; see Periodic points of complex quadratic mappings
 Characteristic multiplier, an eigenvalue of a monodromy matrix
 Multiplier algebra, a construction on C*-Algebras and similar structures

Electrical engineering 
 Binary multiplier, a digital circuit to perform rapid multiplication of two numbers in binary representation
 Analog multiplier, a device that multiplies two analog signals
 Frequency multiplier, a device that generates a signal at an integer multiple of its input frequency
 Voltage multiplier, an electrical circuit that converts AC electrical power from a lower voltage to a higher DC voltage.
 Schweigger multiplier, an early galvanometer

Macroeconomics 
 Multiplier (economics), any measure of the proportional effect of an exogenous variable on an endogenous variable
 Fiscal multiplier, the ratio of the change in aggregate demand  to the change in government spending that caused it
 Money multiplier, the ratio of the money generated by the banking system to the central bank's increase in the monetary base that caused it

Others 
 Force multiplier, in warfare a factor that dramatically increases the combat-effectiveness of a given military force
 A multiplier fishing reel creates less friction when casting
 A CPU multiplier allows a CPU to perform more cycles per single cycle of the front side bus
 Multiplier (linguistics), an adjective indicating number of times something is to be multiplied
 Multipliers: How the Best Leaders Make Everyone Smarter